Joseph Makhanya (born 15 September 1981 in Dobsonville, Gauteng) is a South African association football midfielder who last played for Moroka Swallows in the Premier Soccer League and South Africa.

He hails from Dobsonville, Soweto and he is the son of former the footballer of Orlando Pirates Ernest Makhanya also known as Botsotso Makhanya.

External links

1981 births
South African soccer players
2006 Africa Cup of Nations players
Living people
Orlando Pirates F.C. playersgoals scored 12
Moroka Swallows F.C. players
Association football midfielders
Sportspeople from Soweto